Henry Soane (1622–1661) was a Virginia politician and landowner. He emigrated to Virginia around 1651, settling in James City County along the Chickahominy River. He served in the House of Burgesses 1652–55, 1658, and 1660–61, and was its Speaker in 1661.  He was married to Judith Fuller, which whom they had five children. The progenitor of a political dynasty that spanned two centuries, Soane is the great-great grandfather of President Thomas Jefferson.

See also
 Ancestry of Thomas Jefferson

References

Speakers of the Virginia House of Burgesses
People from James City County, Virginia
1622 births
1661 deaths

English emigrants